RC Argo is a Ukrainian rugby club in Kyiv.

History
The club was founded in 1992.

Players

Current squad

External links
 RC Argo

Rugby clubs established in 1992
Ukrainian rugby union teams
Sport in Kyiv